Mike Simpson (December 11, 1962 – December 18, 2009) was an American businessman and politician who served as the Michigan State Representative for the 65th district from 2007 until his death in 2009. He was a member of the Democratic Party.

Education 
Mike Simpson received his high school diploma at Plymouth-Canton High School. After high school the Representative attended college for some time.

Professional experience 
Mike Simpson was a veteran who served in the United States Army Reserve from 1980–1986. After high school Simpson joined his family's business and was an entrepreneur and business owner until his death.

Political experience 
In 2006 Mike was elected state representative in Michigan's 65th house district after having run in the same district in 2004 and in US House District 7 in 2002.

Organizations 
He was a member of all five local business chambers in the 65th District; Jackson Area Chamber of Commerce, Eaton Rapids Area Chamber of Commerce, Brooklyn-Irish Hills Chamber of Commerce, Grass Lake Regional Chamber of Commerce and the Onsted Area Chamber of Commerce.

He was a member of the Brooklyn Area Kiwanis Club, the Michigan Farm Bureau, the American Legion Post 252, the National Rifle Association and the Michigan Fraternal Order of Police Lodge 70.

House committees 
At the time of his death Simpson served as a member of the House Tourism & Natural Resources Committee, the House Commerce Committee, and the House Insurance Committee.  Additionally, Mike was the Majority Vice-Chairman of the House Health Policy Committee, a standing member of the National Conference of State Legislators, National Health Policy Committee, and a member of the Board of Directors for the Michigan Center for Rural Health.

Death
Simpson had been ill with a rare blood disorder known as light-chain deposition. He died of a heart attack while returning from the Cleveland Clinic, according to House Speaker Andy Dillon, on December 18, 2009.

References 

1962 births
2009 deaths
Politicians from Ypsilanti, Michigan
Military personnel from Michigan
Democratic Party members of the Michigan House of Representatives
21st-century American politicians
20th-century American politicians
Deaths from blood disease
United States Army reservists